Phyllanthus pavonianus, synonym Phyllanthus haughtii, is a species of plant in the family Phyllanthaceae. It is native from south Ecuador to north-west Peru.  Its natural habitat is subtropical or tropical moist montane forests. Under the synonym Phyllanthus haughtii, it has been regarded as "endangered".

References

Flora of Ecuador
Flora of Peru
pavonianus
Endangered plants
Taxonomy articles created by Polbot
Taxa named by Henri Ernest Baillon
Taxobox binomials not recognized by IUCN